James Sellar may refer to:
 James Sellar (footballer), Australian rules footballer
 James Sellar (minister), Scottish minister
 James Sellar (curler), British wheelchair curler
 James Zimri Sellar, Australian politician

See also
 James Sellars, Scottish architect